Kohler Kitchen & Bath, a division of the Kohler Company, manufactures kitchen and bath plumbing fixtures. The Kohler Kitchen & Bath Group has locations in Wisconsin, Pennsylvania, Oregon, Canada, and France.

Subsidiaries

Sterling Plumbing 
Sterling Plumbing produces shower doors, baths, showers, sink faucets, toilets, kitchen accessories, toilet seats, and bathroom wash basin.

Robern 
Robern, a subsidiary of Kohler since 1995, manufactures cabinets, mirrors, vanities and bathroom lighting. Robern is headquartered in Bristol, Pennsylvania.

Kallista 
Established in 1979 in San Francisco, California, Kallista manufactures designer faucets, sinks, consoles, whirlpools and cabinets.

Hytec 
Based in Armstrong British Columbia, Hytec Manufacturing was purchased by the Kohler Company in 1987, when it became Hytec Plumbing Products, a division of Kohler Canada Company. Hytec manufactures gelcoat and acrylic bathtubs, showers, and shower receptors.

Jacob Delafon 
Jacob Delafon, acquired by the Kohler Company in 1986, manufactures baths, showers, sinks, bathtubs, and shower enclosures. In 2003, the name of Jacob Delafon became Kohler France.

Kohler Mira 
The Kohler Company also owns Kohler Mira Ltd, a plumbing company based in Cheltenham, Gloucestershire known for its brand of Mira showers, the second most popular shower brand in the United Kingdom behind Triton Showers. Kohler bought Mira Showers in 2011.

References

External links
 Kohler Company
 Kohler Walk-In Bath

Kohler Company
Manufacturing companies based in Wisconsin
Sheboygan County, Wisconsin
Bathroom fixture companies